The 13th Pan American Games were held in Mar del Plata, Argentina from July 23 – August 8, 1999.

Medals

Gold

 Men's 5000 metres - David Galván
 Men's 20 kilometres walk - Bernardo Segura
 Men's 50 kilometres walk - Joel Sánchez
 Women's 400 metres - Ana Guevara
 Women's 5000 metres - Adriana Fernandez
 Women's 10,000 metres - Nora Rocha
 Women's 20 kilometres walk - Graciela Mendoza

 Men's 10m Platform - Fernando Platas

 Men's team - Mexico

 Men's Flyweight (– 58 kg) - Óscar Salazar
 Men's Middleweight (– 80 kg) - Víctor Estrada

Silver

 Men's 10,000 metres - David Galván
 Men's 20 kilometres walk - Daniel Garcia
 Men's 50 kilometres walk - Carlos Mercenario
 Women's 20 kilometres walk - Rosario Sánchez

 Men's Light Flyweight (48 kilograms) - Liborio Romero

 Men's Points Race - Luis Martínez
 Women's 500 m Time Trial - Nancy Contreras
 Women's 25 km Points Race - Belem Guerrero

 Men's 3m Springboard - Fernando Platas

 Women's Individual foil - Cecilia Esteva

 Women's team - Mexico

 Women's Kata - Ulda Alarcon

 Women's - Rocío Arias

 Lightweight Four-Oared Shell Without Coxswain - Mexico

 Men's Heavyweight (+ 80 kg) - Rodrigo Martinez

 Men's doubles - Óscar Ortiz & Marco Osorio

Bronze

 Women's team - Mexico

 Men's 400 metres - Alejandro Cárdenas

 Men's Doubles - Bernardo Monreal & Luis Lopezllera

 Women's team - Laura Almaral & Mayra Huerta

 Men's Doubles - Daniel Falconi, Roberto Silva, Victor de la Fuente, Ernesto Avila
 Women's Doubles - Leticia Ituarte, Maria Martinez, Gloria Ortega, Veronica Hernández

 Men's Flyweight (51 kilograms) - Daniel Ponce de León
 Men's Featherweight (57 kilograms) - Jorge Martinez
 Men's Lightweight (60 kilograms) - Cristian Bejarano

 Men's C-1 1000 metres - José Romero
 Men's C-2 1000 metres - Mexico

 Men's 10m Platform - Eduardo Rueda
 Women's 10m Platform - María Alcalá

 Individual dressage - Bernadette Pujals Cavallo
 Team dressage - Mexico

 Women's Extra-Lightweight (48 kg) - Adriana Angeles

 Men's Kata - Hector Ortiz
 Men's Kumite (75 kg) - Tetsuo Alonso Murayama
 Men's Kumite (80 kg) - Antonio Puente Torres
 Women's Kumite (+ 60 kg) - Cristina Madrid

 Men's - Sergio Salazar

 Men's doubles - Alvaro Beltrán, Javier Moreno

 Women's Double sculls - Manuela González, Maurenis Hernández

 Women's Europe class - Tanía Elias Calles

 Men's 50 metre rifle three positions - Roberto José Elias

 Women's team - Mexico

 Team - Mexico

 Women's Flyweight (– 49 kg) - Agueda López

 Women's Tricks - Mariana Ramirez

 Women's Lightweight (– 58 kg) - Soraya Jiménez

 Greco-Roman (76 kg) - Rodolfo Hernández

Results by event

References

Nations at the 1999 Pan American Games
P
1999